Cyrtotrachelus is a genus of beetles belonging to the family Curculionidae.

Species 

Cyrtotrachelus areolatus Fairmaire, 1899 
Cyrtotrachelus bipartitus Hartmann, 1899 
Cyrtotrachelus birmanicus Faust, 1895 
Cyrtotrachelus bispinus Chevrolat, 1882 
Cyrtotrachelus borealis Jordan, 1894 
Cyrtotrachelus buqueti Guérin-Méneville, 1844 
Cyrtotrachelus davidis Fairmaire, 1878 
Cyrtotrachelus dichrous Fairmaire, 1878 
Cyrtotrachelus dorsalis Heller, 1923 
Cyrtotrachelus dux Boheman in Schönherr, 1845 
Cyrtotrachelus elegans Fairmaire, 1878 
Cyrtotrachelus feae Faust, 1895 
Cyrtotrachelus himalayanus Heller, 1923 
Cyrtotrachelus holomelas Heller, 1923 
Cyrtotrachelus humeralis Heller, 1923 
Cyrtotrachelus javanus Heller, 1923 
Cyrtotrachelus lar Schoenherr, 1838 
Cyrtotrachelus longimanus (Fabricius, 1775) 
Cyrtotrachelus longipes Schönherr, 1838 
Cyrtotrachelus montanus Heller, 1923 
Cyrtotrachelus myrmidon Buquet in Guérin-Méneville, 1844 
Cyrtotrachelus nigrinus Heller, 1923 
Cyrtotrachelus nigrocinctus Faust, 1895 
Cyrtotrachelus nigrodiscalis Heller, 1923 
Cyrtotrachelus obscuriceps Chevrolat, 1882 
Cyrtotrachelus quadrimaculatus Buquet in Guérin-Méneville, 1844 
Cyrtotrachelus rex Chevrolat, 1882 
Cyrtotrachelus rufithorax Heller, 1923 
Cyrtotrachelus rufopectinipes Chevrolat, 1882 
Cyrtotrachelus subnotatus Voss, 1931 
Cyrtotrachelus sumatranus Heller, 1923

References 

 Biolib

Dryophthorinae